Franz Wiegele (born 23 November 1965) is an Austrian former ski jumper.

References

External links

1965 births
Living people
Austrian male ski jumpers
Universiade medalists in ski jumping
Sportspeople from Villach
Universiade bronze medalists for Austria
Competitors at the 1993 Winter Universiade
20th-century Austrian people